"Desire" is a song by English singer Geri Halliwell from her third solo studio album, Passion (2005). The song was written by Henrik Korpi, Mathias Wollo, Terry Ronald and Halliwell, and produced by Korpi & Blackcell. "Desire" metaphorically describes the persona as a feline with sexual desires.

The song was released on 30 May 2005 as the album's second and final single. It peaked at number 22 on the UK Singles Chart, becoming the lowest-peaking single of Halliwell's solo career to date. To promote the single, Halliwell performed the song on Top of the Pops, Top Gear, CD:UK, The Footy Show, Ministry of Mayhem, Popworld and GMTV.

Music video
The music video for "Desire" was directed by Andy Morahan and edited by Claudia Wass. The video opens with Halliwell waking up at 7:10 a.m. to the sound of the alarm clock. After hopping out of bed, she walks to the refrigerator and grabs a bottle of milk, which she drinks suggestively, before leaving for work. On her way to work, a dog that is being walked by a woman suddenly starts to bark at Halliwell.

Upon arriving at work, she stares flirtatiously at her boss (played by actor Leon Ockenden), who is in his office. She stops by to hand him the folders he had previously asked her to take care of, and then proceeds to behave provocatively around him.

Right after leaving his office, Halliwell finds herself fantasising about him, which involves her crawling across his desk and drinking milk from a saucer. She then performs a choreography with other four women dressed as secretaries, intercut with scenes of her making out with her boss in his office. After waking up from her daydream, she notices her boss is leaving and decides to follow him home, where she turns into a black cat after entering through his window. The boss takes the cat in and pets it in his bed.

The video ends with Halliwell stopping her alarm clock at 7:11 a.m. and holding her pillow tight with a pleased look on her face, indicating that she had been dreaming the entire time.

Track listings

UK CD single 1 and German CD single
 "Desire" – 3:21
 "Lift Me Up" (K-Klass Phazerphunk Edit) – 4:10

UK CD single 2
 "Desire" – 3:21
 "Desire" (Bimbo Jones Remix) – 6:30
 "Desire" (Shanghai  Remix) – 7:10

UK DVD single
 "Desire" (uncut video) – 3:25
 "Ride It" (video) – 4:01
 "Desire" (behind the scenes footage from the video) – 2:00
 "True Love Never Dies" (photo gallery) – 3:36

Australian CD single
 "Desire" – 3:21
 "Desire" (Bimbo Jones Remix Vocal) – 6:30
 "Desire" (Shanghai  Remix) – 7:10
 "Lift Me Up" (K-Klass Phazerphunk Edit) – 4:10

Credits and personnel
Credits adapted from the liner notes of Passion.

Recording locations
 Recorded at Murlyn Studios (Stockholm, Sweden)
 Mixed at Khabang Studio (Älvsjö, Sweden)
 Mastered at Metropolis Studios (London, England)

Personnel
 Geri Halliwell – vocals
 Korpi & Blackcell – production, arrangement, recording, all other instruments
 Niklas Flyckt – mixing
 Emma Holmgren – backing vocals
 Anders Hedlund – live drums
 Tim Young – mastering

Charts

Release history

References

2005 singles
2005 songs
Geri Halliwell songs
Music videos directed by Andy Morahan
Song recordings produced by Korpi & Blackcell
Songs written by Geri Halliwell
Songs written by Henrik Korpi
Songs written by Terry Ronald
Virgin Records singles
Songs written by Mathias Johansson (producer)